Lac d'Avène is a lake at Avène in the Hérault department of France. At an elevation of 430 m, its surface area is 1.9 km².

Avene